Carol Sobieski (March 16, 1939 – November 4, 1990) was an American screenwriter whose work included the scripts for Annie (1982) and Fried Green Tomatoes (1991).

Early life
Sobieski was born Carol O'Brien in Chicago, Illinois, in 1939. Her father was a lawyer and her mother a politician and teacher. Five years later, the family moved close to Amarillo in Texas. Sobieski attended Smith College and received her Master's degree in Literature from Trinity College, Dublin. She married lawyer James Louis Sobieski in 1964, and they had three children.

Film career
In 1978, Sobieski won the Humanitas Prize for the television series Family. She was nominated for two Emmy Awards, for Harry S. Truman: Plain Speaking in 1977, and Sarah, Plain and Tall in 1991.  

Sobieski and author Fannie Flagg were awarded the 1991 USC Scripter Award for their screenplay for Fried Green Tomatoes, the film adaptation of Flagg's novel, Fried Green Tomatoes at the Whistle Stop Cafe. They were also nominated for an Academy Award for Best Adapted Screenplay.

Filmography
1973: Sunshine
1976: Family 
1976: Harry S. Truman: Plain Speaking
1976: Amelia Earhart - television miniseries
1978: Casey's Shadow
1980: Honeysuckle Rose
1980: The Women's Room
1982: Annie
1982: The Toy
1985: Sylvester
1988: The Bourne Identity - television movie
1989: Winter People
1991: Sarah, Plain and Tall
1991: Fried Green Tomatoes
1993: Money for Nothing

Death
Sobieski was 51 years old when she passed away on November 4, 1990 in Santa Monica, California.Her cause of death was from the blood plasma liver disease known as amyloidosis. She survived by her husband and three children.

References

External links

1939 births
1990 deaths
Screenwriters from Illinois
Writers from Chicago
American women screenwriters
20th-century American women writers
20th-century American screenwriters